Binadioub  is a village in the Bassar Prefecture in the Kara Region  of north-western Togo.  The language spoken in Togo is French.

References

Populated places in Kara Region
Bassar Prefecture